Hastula is a genus of sea snails, marine gastropod mollusks in the family Terebridae, the auger snails.

Distribution
Species in this genus can be found in the Indo-Pacific Region, Australia and Tasmania.

Habitat and feeding habits
These are sand-dwelling snails that burrow into the sand no deeper than their length. These are carnivorous snails, feeding on polychaete worms.

Description
The shell is smooth and glossy. It is very high and turreted with impressed sutures. The shell shows axial sculpturing of crenulations below the slender ribs. There is often no spiral sculpture; some species show very weak spiral lines.

Species
Species within the genus Hastula include:

 Hastula aciculina (Lamarck, 1822)
 Hastula acumen (Deshayes, 1859)
 Hastula alboflava Bratcher, 1988
 Hastula albula (Menke, 1843)
 Hastula androyensis Bozzetti, 2008
 Hastula anomala (Gray, 1834)
 Hastula anosyana (Bozzetti, 2016)
 Hastula apicina (Deshayes, 1859)
 Hastula apicitincta (G. B. Sowerby III, 1900)
 Hastula bacillus (Deshayes, 1859)
 † Hastula beyrichi (Semper, 1861)
 Hastula casta (Hinds, 1844)
 Hastula celidonota (Melvill & Sykes, 1898)
 Hastula cernohorskyi R. D. Burch, 1965
 Hastula cinerea (Born, 1778)
 Hastula continua (Deshayes, 1859)
 Hastula crossii (Deshayes, 1859)
 Hastula cuspidata (Hinds, 1844)
 Hastula daniae (Aubry, 2008)
 Hastula denizi Rolàn & Gubbioli, 2000
 Hastula diversa (E. A. Smith, 1901)
 Hastula engi Malcolm & Terryn, 2017
 Hastula escondida (Terryn, 2006)
 Hastula exacuminata Sacco, 1891
 † Hastula farinesi (Fontannes, 1881)
 Hastula filmerae (G.B. Sowerby III, 1906)
 Hastula hamamotoi Tsuchida & Tanaka, 1999
 Hastula hastata (Gmelin, 1791)
 Hastula hectica (Linnaeus, 1758)
 † Hastula houstonia (Harris, 1895)
 Hastula imitatrix (Aufenberg & Lee, 1988)
 Hastula inconstans (Hinds, 1844)
 Hastula kiiensis Chino & Terryn, 2019
 Hastula knockeri (E.A. Smith, 1872)
 Hastula lanceata (Linnaeus, 1767)
 Hastula lanterii Terryn, 2018
 Hastula leloeuffi Bouchet, 1982
 Hastula lepida (Hinds, 1844)
 Hastula luctuosa (Hinds, 1844)
 Hastula marqueti (Aubry, 1994)
 Hastula maryleeae Burch, 1965
 Hastula matheroniana (Deshayes, 1859)
 Hastula nana (Deshayes, 1859)
 Hastula natalensis (E. A. Smith, 1903)
 Hastula nimbosa (Hinds, 1844)
 Hastula ogasawarana Chino & Terryn, 2019
 Hastula palauensis Terryn, Gori & Rosado, 2019
 Hastula parva (Baird, 1873)
 Hastula penicillata (Hinds, 1844)
 Hastula philippiana (Deshayes, 1859)
 † Hastula pseudobasteroti Lozouet, 2017 
 Hastula puella (Thiele, 1925)
 Hastula raphanula (Lamarck, 1822)
 Hastula rossacki Sprague, 2000
 Hastula rufopunctata (E.A. Smith, 1877)
 Hastula salleana (Deshayes, 1859)
 Hastula sandrogorii Ryall, Terryn & Rosado, 2017
 Hastula sendersi Terryn & Keppens, 2020
 Hastula solida (Deshayes, 1855)
 Hastula strigilata (Linnaeus, 1758)
 Hastula stylata (Hinds, 1844)
 † Hastula sublaevigata (Grateloup, 1845) 
 † Hastula sublaevissima Lozouet, 2017 
 Hastula tenuicolorata Bozzetti, 2008
 Hastula tiedemani Burch, 1965
 Hastula tobagoensis (Nowell-Usticke, 1969)
 Hastula trailli (Deshayes, 1859)
 Hastula venus Aubry, 2008
 Hastula verreauxi Deshayes, 1857
 Hastula westralica (Aubry, 1999)
 Hastula willemfaberi Terryn, 2020

Taxon inquirendum
 Hastula colorata Bratcher, 1988
Species brought into synonymy
 Hastula albofuscata Bozzetti, 2008: synonym of Partecosta albofuscata (Bozzetti, 2008)
 Hastula betsyae Burch, 1965: synonym of Hastula penicillata (Hinds, 1844)
 Hastula brazieri (Angas, 1871): synonym of Profunditerebra brazieri (Angas, 1871)
 Hastula caliginosa (Deshayes, 1859): synonym of Strioterebrum caliginosum (Deshayes, 1859)
 Hastula lauta Pease, 1869: synonym of Hastula matheroniana (Deshayes, 1859)
 Hastula lineopunctata (Bozzetti, 2008): synonym of Oxymeris lineopunctata (Bozzetti, 2008)
 Hastula micans Hinds, 1844: synonym of Hastula aciculina (Lamarck, 1822)
 Hastula nitida (Hinds, 1844): synonym of Strioterebrum nitidum (Hinds, 1844)
 Hastula plumbea (Quoy & Gaimard, 1964): synonym of Strioterebrum plumbeum (Quoy & Gaimard, 1833)
 Hastula tenera (Hinds, 1844): synonym of Partecosta tenera (Hinds, 1844)
 Hastula trilineata Bozzetti, 2008 (temporary name): synonym of Partecosta trilineata (Bozzetti, 2008)

References

 Oyama K. (1961). On some new facts of the taxonomy of Terebridae. Venus. 21(2): 176-189
 Terryn Y. (2007). Terebridae: A Collectors Guide. Conchbooks & NaturalArt. 59pp + plates.

External links
 Adams H. & Adams A. (1853-1858). The genera of Recent Mollusca; arranged according to their organization. London, van Voorst. Vol. 1: xl + 484 pp.; vol. 2: 661 pp.; vol. 3: 138 pls. [Published in parts: Vol. 1: i-xl (1858), 1-256 (1853), 257-484 (1854). Vol. 2: 1-92 (1854), 93-284 (1855), 285-412 (1856), 413-540 (1857), 541-661 (1858). Vol. 3: pl. 1-32 (1853), 33-96 (1855), 97-112 (1856), 113-128 (1857), 129-138 (1858)] 
 Dall W.H. (1908). Subdivisions of the Terebridae. The Nautilus. 21(11): 124-125
 Rehder, H. A. 1980. The marine mollusks of Easter Island (Isla de Pascua) and Sala y Gómez. Smithsonian Contributions to Zoology 289:1-167, 15 figs., 14 pls. page(s): 93

Terebridae
Gastropod genera